Thomas Hincks (5 January 1808 – 28 March 1882) was an Irish Anglican priest  in the 19th century.

Hincks was born in Cork and educated at Trinity College, Dublin.  He was Archdeacon of Connor from 1865  until his death in 1882.

References

19th-century Irish Anglican priests
Archdeacons of Connor
Alumni of Trinity College Dublin
1882 deaths
1808 births
Church of Ireland priests
Clergy from Cork (city)